Compostibacillus  is a Gram-positive, moderately thermophilic rod-shaped, and spore-forming genus of bacteria from the family of Bacillaceae with one known species (Compostibacillus humi). Compostibacillus humi has been isolated from sludge compost from Guangdong in China.

References

Bacillaceae
Bacteria genera
Monotypic bacteria genera